Patrick Joseph "Nobby" Clark (June 18, 1897 – August 5, 1966) was a Canadian professional ice hockey defenceman, most notably for the Boston Bruins of the National Hockey League, for whom he played five games in the 1927–28 season. He was born in Orillia, Ontario.

Career statistics

Regular season and playoffs

External links

1897 births
1966 deaths
Boston Bruins players
Canadian ice hockey defencemen
Ice hockey people from Ontario
Minneapolis Millers (AHA) players
New Haven Eagles players
People from Orillia
Philadelphia Arrows players
Place of death missing
St. Louis Flyers (AHA) players
Canadian expatriate ice hockey players in the United States